Metroid Prime 3: Corruption is an action-adventure game developed by Retro Studios and published by Nintendo for the Wii. The seventh main game in the Metroid series, it was released in North America and Europe in 2007 and in Japan the following year.

Corruption is set six months after the events of Metroid Prime 2: Echoes (2004). It follows the bounty hunter Samus Aran, who becomes infected with Phazon by her doppelgänger Dark Samus. Samus works to prevent the Phazon from spreading to other planets while being corrupted by the Phazon.

The player controls Samus using the Wii Remote and Nunchuk devices. The remote is used for jumping, aiming, and firing weapons, while the Nunchuk enables actions such as moving Samus and locking onto enemies. Corruption introduces features such as Hypermode, which allows Samus to use more powerful attacks, and the ability to command her gunship. The new control scheme took a year to develop and delayed the game's release several times. The game was first shown to the public at the E3 2005 trade show.

Like the previous Prime games, the game received critical acclaim, with reviews praising its gameplay, graphics and music, though some were divided on the controls. More than one million copies were sold in 2007. It was re-released in August 2009 as part of the compilation Metroid Prime: Trilogy. A sequel, Metroid Prime 4, was announced in June 2017 for the Nintendo Switch.

Gameplay 

Metroid Prime 3: Corruption is a first-person action-adventure game. The player controls the protagonist, Samus Aran, using the Wii Remote and Nunchuk devices. The Nunchuk enables the player to perform actions such as moving Samus and locking on to enemies and targets. The Wii Remote allows the player to execute actions such as jumping, aiming, and firing weapons.

Corruption is a large, open-ended game that takes place across several planets, each with regions connected by elevators, rail systems and bridges. Each region has rooms separated by doors that can be opened when shot with the correct weapon. The gameplay revolves around solving puzzles to uncover secrets, jumping on platforms, and shooting enemies with the help of a "lock-on" mechanism that allows Samus to move in a circle while staying aimed on an enemy. The "lock-on" mechanism also allows Samus to use the Grapple Beam to attach onto and pull objects, such as enemy shields or certain doors. The game uses a first-person view, except in Morph Ball mode, in which Samus's suit transforms into an armored ball and the game uses a third-person camera. The third person camera is also used in conjunction with the Screw Attack power-up: in this case Samus's suit emits strange energy waves as she performs a continuous jump.

The game's heads-up display simulates the inside of Samus' helmet, and features a radar, map, ammunition gauge and health meter. The player can change visors to enable new abilities such as X-ray vision, collecting information on many items, creatures and enemies, and interfacing with certain mechanisms such as force fields and elevators. Corruption also includes a hint system that periodically displays on-screen instructions and navigation assistance. The game also has the addition of the Hypermode, a feature in which health is drained to give temporary invincibility and more powerful attacks. After a certain amount of time, the player will enter Corrupt Hypermode, and if not stopped leads to a non-standard game over due to Samus being overtaken by Phazon. Another new feature is the Command Visor, which allows Samus to summon remotely her gunship from a suitable landing site to save the game, or travel to another destination quickly. During the progress of the game, new abilities can be obtained to allow it to perform aerial attacks against enemy targets and transport heavy objects. The game also features an achievement system, with players able to earn special credits by completing specific in-game objectives. These credits can be exchanged for bonuses such as concept art, music for the sound test, and decorations for Samus's gunship.

Synopsis

Setting 
The events in Metroid Prime 3: Corruption take place six months after Metroid Prime 2: Echoes. The game's protagonist, Samus Aran, is a bounty hunter hired to assist the Galactic Federation during its ongoing conflict with the Space Pirates. After facing initial defeat on the planet Zebes during the events of the first Metroid, the Space Pirates sought to gain power by using a newly discovered mutagen called Phazon. However, Samus managed to disrupt their operations throughout the Prime trilogy, while the Galactic Federation confiscated and repurposed their Phazon armaments.

The Space Pirates' operation was left in disarray following defeat in Metroid Prime 2: Echoes. They inadvertently encounter Dark Samus, Samus's sinister doppelgänger, while trying to harvest Phazon. Dark Samus eliminates a third of their forces while indoctrinating the remaining Space Pirates into servants. Their combined forces seek to corrupt the universe with Phazon by first executing a series of methodical attacks on three Federation planets: Norion, Bryyo, and Elysia. The game is primarily centered on these planets and three other locations that become accessible after completing certain in-game tasks.

Plot 

Fleet Admiral Castor Dane, the commander of the Galactic Federation flagship GFS Olympus, calls for a meeting with Samus Aran and three other bounty hunters—Rundas, Ghor, and Gandrayda. The bounty hunters receive orders to clear a virus from several organic supercomputers called "Aurora Units", located throughout the galaxy. The meeting ends abruptly when Space Pirates attack the Federation fleet. Samus and the other bounty hunters are deployed to the planet Norion, where the Space Pirates are concentrating an attack on the main Federation base. While suppressing the attack, Samus learns that a Phazon meteoroid, called a Leviathan Seed, will soon collide into Norion. Samus and the other bounty hunters attempt to activate the base's defense systems, when they are suddenly attacked by Dark Samus. With the other bounty hunters knocked out, a severely wounded Samus manages to activate the system just in time to destroy the Leviathan Seed before she falls unconscious.

A month later, Samus awakens aboard Olympus, where she learns that Dark Samus's Phazon-based attacks have corrupted her. The Federation equips her suit with a Phazon Enhancement Device (PED) that enables her to harness the Phazon energy within herself. She is informed that her fellow bounty hunters, also corrupted with Phazon and equipped with PEDs, have gone missing during their missions to investigate several planets embedded with Leviathan Seeds. Samus is first sent to the planet Bryyo and later Elysia to determine what happened to her missing comrades. She soon discovers that both planets and their inhabitants are slowly being corrupted by the Leviathan Seeds and that she must destroy the seeds to reverse this. Samus encounters heavy resistance from the Space Pirates, Phazon-corrupted monstrosities, and her fellow bounty hunters who have been corrupted by Dark Samus.

Throughout her mission, which eventually takes her to the Space Pirate homeworld, Samus slowly becomes further Phazon-corrupted. She manages to stop the Space Pirate assault with the assistance of the Federation troops. After stealing a Leviathan battleship, Samus and the Federation fleet use it to create a wormhole that leads to the planet Phaaze, the origin point of Phazon. Samus travels to the planet's core, where she finally defeats Dark Samus and then the corrupted Aurora Unit 313. As a result, Dark Samus is obliterated, and Phaaze explodes, rendering all Phazon in the galaxy inert. The Federation fleet escapes Phaaze's destruction, but loses contact with Samus in the process. Samus eventually appears in her gunship, and reports that the mission is accomplished before flying off into space.

Samus returns to Elysia, where she mourns the loss of her fellow bounty hunters. If the player completes the game with all of the items obtained, Samus is seen flying into hyperspace, with Sylux's spaceship following her.

Development 

Retro Studios intended to give Metroid Prime 3: Corruption larger environments than Metroid Prime 2: Echoes, including open world features, and enable the game to run at 60 frames per second. There were also plans to have more interactive sequences involving Samus' ship. However, when Retro learned of the Wii's technical specifications, they found the system was less powerful then they had anticipated and had to scale back on these plans. The developers were also interested in using the WiiConnect24 feature to provide additional content for the game that would be accessible from the Internet. Retro announced that Corruption would be the final chapter of the Prime series and would have a plot "about closure, told against the backdrop of an epic struggle". After the Wii Remote was revealed, Nintendo demonstrated how Metroid Prime 3 would take advantage of the controller's special abilities with a version of Echoes modified for the Wii and shown at the Tokyo Game Show in 2005. At the Media Summit held by Nintendo in May 2007, Nintendo of America president Reggie Fils-Aimé said that Metroid games "never played this way before" when referring to Corruption. He also noted that Nintendo employees who had seen the game in action claimed that it "will reinvent the control scheme for a first-person shooter".

Game director Mark Pacini stated that the biggest concern Retro had during production was the controls, which had "too many functions for the amount of buttons". Pacini also said the Wii Zapper, a gun shell peripheral, was never considered because it was unveiled when the game's development was almost done. Retro president Michael Kelbaugh said that the delays for the game's release gave them more time to tune the controller, which took a year. He also stated that while Retro did "a great job on the multiplayer in Metroid Prime 2", focus was centered on the single player portion of the game, which was considered to be "the core strength of the franchise". Art director Todd Keller declared the graphics to be focused in both texture detail and variety, with every single texture being hand-made and trying to "make every room its own custom stage". During development, the Nintendo EAD team involved with Corruption suggested Retro to turn Hypermode into the core of the game, saying it would enhance the tension as it made players powerful but if used excessively would lead to a game over. Retro initially disagreed, saying it would be difficult to implement the feature without dampening the entertainment value, but after discussion decided to turn Hyper Mode into a regular functionality of the game.

The soundtrack for Metroid Prime 3: Corruption was composed by Kenji Yamamoto, Minako Hamano and Masaru Tajima. The game took advantage of the increase in the amount of RAM that took place when the series switched from the GameCube to the Wii; this allowed for higher quality audio samples to be used and thus allowing a better overall audio quality. Yamamoto used Hirokazu Tanaka's musical design of the original Metroid in Corruption, by keeping the music and themes dark and scary until the very end, when uplifting music is played during the credits. Corruption is the first Metroid game to feature a significant amount of voice acting, compared to previous games in the series in which Samus "[acted] alone [... and] always came across as a lone wolf". The producers decided to include voices to create a stronger connection between players and the characters. The characters' voices were performed by Timothy Patrick Miller, Lainie Frasier, Christopher Sabat, Edwin Neal, Claire Hamilton, Brian Jepson, Gray Haddock, Clayton Kjas and Ken Webster.

Release 
The game was first shown to the public at the Electronic Entertainment Expo (E3) 2005 in a short pre-rendered trailer. It was later announced during Nintendo's press conference at the E3 2006. Nintendo revealed in May that Corruption would be released as a launch game for the Wii console, but a few months later it was delayed to 2007. That year in April, Fils-Aimé said in an interview that Corruption was "not going to ship by June" and set it at a summer release date at the earliest. In late April, IGN editor Matt Casamassina revealed that the game would be released on August 20 in the United States. Nintendo of America later announced to have moved the release date to August 27, but Nintendo finally revealed an "in stores" date of August 28. The game was later released in Europe on October 26, and in Japan on March 6, 2008. In the Japanese version, the game's difficulty level is decided by answering to "a questionnaire from the Galactic Federation", in contrast to the North American version where the difficulty level is chosen directly by the player. Metroid Prime series producer Kensuke Tanabe said that an idea for a questionnaire came from Retro Studios.

Casamassina initially criticized Nintendo for its minimal marketing campaign for Corruption and compared it to the larger campaign for the original Metroid Prime, which included its own live action advertisement. He concluded that the campaign was the result of Nintendo's new focus on casual games for their console. When questioned on the company's actions, Nintendo of America responded: "Nintendo fans will be surprised by the quantity and quality of Metroid Prime 3: Corruption information that becomes available before the game launches on Aug. 27. Your patience will be rewarded (or Corrupted)". Following this promise, Nintendo released the "Metroid Prime 3 Preview" channel on August 10 in North America and on October 15 in Europe. The channel, available as a free download via the Wii Shop Channel, allowed Wii owners to view preview videos of the game that included a battle sequence and previously unannounced details on new characters. The Preview channel was the first in a series of new downloadable content including videos made available in North America. The "month of Metroid", as named by Nintendo, included Virtual Console versions of Metroid, available on August 13, and Super Metroid, available on August 20.

Rerelease 
Metroid Prime 3 was rereleased on August 24, 2009 in North America and Europe, alongside Metroid Prime and Metroid Prime 2: Echoes, as a single-disc compilation, Metroid Prime: Trilogy. Prime and Echoes feature the motion controls and achievement systems introduced in Corruption. The compilation was later rereleased on the Wii U's Nintendo eShop on January 29, 2015.

Reception 

Metroid Prime 3: Corruption received critical acclaim. Nintendo Power praised the visuals and the immersive gameplay, calling it one the best Wii games. IGN awarded it the Editor's Choice Award, and noted that the game was beautifully designed and the best looking game for the Wii. They also praised the inclusion of "well-done" voice acting, in contrast to the lack of any voice acting in most other Nintendo games. Despite stating that Metroid Prime 3 was too similar to its predecessors, the review concluded that it was the best game in the Prime trilogy. IGN also said that it could be worthy of the same score as the original Metroid Prime (9.8), had it not been for the aforementioned reason. X-Play claimed that the game was enjoyable, but it had a few awkward control mechanics and was a little difficult to control on the Wii. They also said that although it was fun, there were problems that lead to odd lock-on mechanics and painful wrists from continuous motions.

Shane Satterfield from GameTrailers praised the more user-friendly and action-packed nature of the game compared to Metroid Prime and Echoes. Satterfield also praised the superior motion-sensitive controls and further added that those elements make Corruption "far superior to the original Metroid Prime". 1UP.com was enthusiastic about the new control system and said the graphics were "some of the best visuals in gaming, period". Electronic Gaming Monthly gave Corruption a Silver award and named it one of the Games of the Month. GameSpot stated the game had enjoyable puzzles, boss battles, atmospheric levels, and smooth gameplay. It also explained that the game was more like a traditional shooter video game than an adventure shooter, and stated that the motion activated actions were too unresponsive.

GamesRadar named Metroid Prime 3: Corruption the 10th best Wii game of all time out of a list of 25, stating that "Metroid Prime 3 is the ultimate achievement of the series. The formula, which was repeated several times by Corruption, has been tweaked and pruned to its most perfect point, with some of the best shooting on the system". In IGN's Best of 2007 Awards, Corruption received the awards for Best Wii Adventure Game, Best Artistic Design, and Best Overall Adventure Game. GameSpy ranked it as the second best Wii game of the year, behind Super Mario Galaxy, and honored it as the Best Innovation on the Wii. Australian website MyWii named Prime 3 as the second best Wii game currently available, behind Super Mario Galaxy. In 2009, Official Nintendo Magazine called the game a "fantastic finale", placing it 35th on a list of greatest Nintendo games. Despite being released on August 27, Corruption was the fifth best-selling game of the month, with 218,100 copies sold. It also debuted at the fifth spot of the Japanese charts, with 34,000 units in the first week of release. More than one million copies of the game were sold in 2007, and as of March 2008, 1.31 million copies of the game were sold worldwide.

Sequels 
A spin-off, Metroid Prime: Federation Force, was developed by Next Level Games and released for the Nintendo 3DS in 2016.

In 2015, Metroid Prime series producer Kensuke Tanabe said that they were doing a story on the Galactic Federation. Regarding Corruptions ending, Tanabe wanted to create a story that centers on Samus and Sylux, noting that "there's something going on between them. I want to make a game that touches upon it". Tanabe added that Nintendo had no plans on releasing the next Metroid Prime game for the Wii U at the time, and that a new installment would most likely be developed for the company's next home console, then known as the NX.

A fourth mainline installment, Metroid Prime 4, was announced during the Nintendo Spotlight presentation at E3 2017, in development for the Nintendo Switch. The game was headed by series producer Kensuke Tanabe. The development was originally led by Bandai Namco Studios in Singapore, which included some staff members who worked on the cancelled Star Wars 1313 game. In January 2019, development of Prime 4 was restarted, with Retro Studios returning to develop the game.

References

External links 
 Official Metroid series website
 Metroid Prime 3: Corruption profile at Nintendo.com
 Official Retro Studios website

2007 video games
Experimental medical treatments in fiction
First-person shooters
First-person adventure games
Metroid Prime
Fiction about mind control
Retro Studios games
Single-player video games
Interquel video games
Video game sequels
Video games developed in the United States
Video games featuring female protagonists
Video games scored by Kenji Yamamoto (composer, born 1964)
Video games set in outer space
Video games set on fictional planets
Wii games
Wii-only games
Metroidvania games
Metroid games
Video games produced by Kensuke Tanabe
Voice acting